The Rhein-Neckar-Kreis is a district in the northwest of Baden-Württemberg, Germany. The administrative headquarters are based in the city Heidelberg, which is a district-free city. As of 2019, the district is the most populous in Baden-Württemberg.

History
The district was created in 1973 by merging the previous districts of Heidelberg, Mannheim and Sinsheim.

Geography
The district is named after the two main rivers which flow through the district, the Rhine and Neckar. The highest elevation is 580 m near the 584 m tall peak of the Odenwald mountain Stiefelhöhe, located near Heiligkreuzsteinach. The lowest elevation with 92 m is in Ilvesheim, located in the Neckar valley.

Sights

Government
The district is governed by a district assembly (Kreistag) and a district executive (Landrat). The eligible voters of the district elect the Kreistag every 5 years. This body in turn elects the Landrat every 8 years. The Landrat is the legal representative of the district as well as the speaker of the Kreistag and its committees. The Landrat manages the office of the Landrat (Landratsamt) and is the chief official of the district. The duties of the Landrat include the preparation of the district assembly meetings and its committees. The Landrat calls the meetings, acts as speaker, and carries out the decisions made. In the Kreistag, the Landrat has no vote. The Landrat has a second, called the first district official (Erste Landesbeamte).

Landrat of the district Heidelberg 1945–1972:
1945–1946: Hermann Specht (provisional)
1946–1947: Erich Reimann
1947–1954: Herbert Klotz
1954–1972: Georg Steinbrenner

Landrat of the district Mannheim 1945–1972:
1945: Richard Freudenberg (appointed)
1945–1946: Karl Geppert (appointed)
1946: Dr. Valentin Gaa (appointed)
1946–1948: Ernst Becherer
1948–1970: Dr. Valentin Gaa
1970–1972: Albert Neckenauer

Landrat of the district Sinsheim 1945–1972:
1945–1946: Roman Großmann (appointed)
1946: Gottlob Barth und Dr. Kurt von Kirchenheim (both appointed)
1946: Wolfgang Rutschke (appointed to oversee businesses)
1946–1947: Hermann Lindner (appointed)
1947–1948: Dr. Johann Gutermann
1948: Dr. Ludwig Bernheim
1948–1949: Georg Steinbrenner (appointed to oversee businesses)
1949–1950: Dr. Walther Reidel (appointed)
1950–1972: Dr. Paul Herrmann

Landrat of Rhein-Neckar-Kreis since 1973:
1973 Georg Steinbrenner, Amtsverweser
1973–1986: Albert Neckenauer
1986-2010: Dr. Jürgen Schütz
2010 - to present: Stefan Dallinger

Coat of arms
The wavy line in the left of the coat of arms represent the two rivers Rhine and Neckar. The lion in the right side is the symbol of Palatinate, as the area belonged to that area historically.

Towns and municipalities

International relations

Rhein-Neckar-Kreis is twinned with:

 Vichy, France (since 1965)

References

External links

Rhein-Neckar-Kreis
Karlsruhe (region)
Districts of Baden-Württemberg